Lindale and Newton-in-Cartmel, formerly Upper Allithwaite (sometimes Allithwaite Upper) is a civil parish in South Lakeland, Cumbria, England. The spelling Lindale and Newton in Cartmel, without hyphens, is used by the parish council.

The parish includes the villages of Lindale, High Newton and Low Newton and lies north of Grange-over-Sands.

History 
Upper Allithwaite was formerly a township in the parish of Cartmel, in 1866 Upper Allithwaite became a civil parish in its own right. The parish was renamed from "Upper Allithwaite" to "Lindale and Newton-in-Cartmel" on 16 April 2018 as the new name provides a clearer description of the geographical area.

Listed buildings

There are 15 listed buildings or structures in the parish, including St Paul's church, Lindale and the grade II* listed Barrow Wife, a former Quaker meeting house dated 1677 and now a private house.

References

Further reading

External links
 Cumbria County History Trust: Upper Allithwaite (nb: provisional research only – see Talk page)

Civil parishes in Cumbria
South Lakeland District